This is a list of Australian television-related events, debuts, finales, and cancellations that are scheduled to occur in 2021, the 66th year of continuous operation of television in Australia.

Events

March

April

May

June

July

August

November

December

Television channels

New channels/streaming services

Channel closures

Affiliation changes
 1 July – Nine Network programming to air on WIN Television owned and operated stations (excluding NRN)
 1 July – Network Ten programming to air on Southern Cross Austereo owned and operated stations.

Premieres

Domestic series

Programming changes

Changes to network affiliation
Criterion for inclusion in the following list is that Australian premiere episodes will air in Australia for the first time on a new channel. This includes when a program is moved from a free-to-air network's primary channel to a digital multi-channel, as well as when a program moves between subscription television channels – provided the preceding criterion is met. Ended television series which change networks for repeat broadcasts are not included in the list.

Free-to-air premieres
This is a list of programs which made their premiere on Australian free-to-air television that had previously premiered on Australian subscription television. Programs may still air on the original subscription television network.

Subscription premieres
This is a list of programs which made their debut on Australian subscription television, having previously premiered on Australian free-to-air television. Programs may still air (first or repeat) on the original free-to-air television network.

Returning programs
Australian produced programs which are returning with a new season after being absent from television from the previous calendar year.

a Was originally due to premiere on 4 May 2021, but was delayed by three weeks due to a tight production schedule.

Endings

Deaths

See also
 2021 in Australia
 List of Australian films of 2021

References

2021 in Australian television